In Celtic mythology, Dea Matrona ("divine mother goddess") was the goddess who gives her name to the river Marne (ancient Matrŏna) in Gaul.

The Gaulish theonym Mātr-on-ā signifies "great mother" and the goddess of the Marne has been interpreted to be a mother goddess.

Many Gaulish religious images—including inexpensive terracotta statues mass-produced for use in household shrines—depict mother goddesses nursing babies or holding fruits, other foods, or small dogs in their laps. In many areas, such Matronae were depicted in groups of three (or sometimes two) (see Matres and Matronae for the triads of mother goddesses well attested throughout northern Europe).

The name of Welsh mythological figure Modron, mother of Mabon is derived from the same etymon. By analogy, Dea Matrona may conceivably have been considered the mother of the Gaulish Maponos.

See also
 Aveta, another Gallic mother goddess

Sources

 Beck, Jane (1970) "The White Lady of Great Britain and Ireland", in: Folklore 81:4.
 Loomis, Roger (1945) "Morgain La Fee and the Celtic goddesses", in: Speculum. 20:2.
 Meier, Bernhard (1998) Dictionary of Celtic Religion and Culture; Cyril Edwards, trans. Woodbridge: Boydell and Brewer.

Gaulish goddesses
Mother goddesses
Sea and river goddesses